S. Darko, also known as S. Darko: A Donnie Darko Tale, is a 2009 American science fiction thriller film directed by Chris Fisher and starring Daveigh Chase, Briana Evigan, and Ed Westwick. It is the sequel to the 2001 cult film Donnie Darko.

In Donnie Darko, the main character of the same name is a young man troubled by hallucinations of doomsday who ends up being killed by a mysterious falling jet engine. S. Darko is set seven years after  Donnie's death. His sister Samantha Darko is beset by sleepwalking, hallucinations and apparent time travel as she tries to unravel a small town's mysteries.

Plot
Seven years after the bizarre death of Donnie Darko, a young man who was crushed to death by a jet engine that fell from the sky, his now 18-year-old sister Samantha Darko runs away from her family in Middlesex, Virginia and joins her best female friend Corey on a road trip to California. When their car breaks down in Conejo Springs, a tiny Utah town, they are helped by the town's "bad boy", Randy. The pair meet eccentric locals and learn that a local boy, Billy Moorcroft, has gone missing.

Samantha is still struggling with her brother's death and is sleepwalking. While wandering, she meets a homeless veteran with PTSD whom the locals nicknamed "Iraq Jack" (James Lafferty). As the pair sit atop a windmill, she tells him that the world will end soon, but he knows this already. The next morning she wakes up outside, and sees that a meteorite has crashed into the windmill.

A geeky guy, Jeremy (Jackson Rathbone), is interested in buying the meteorite, and chats with Samantha. Randy tells of how he misses his younger brother who has disappeared and is feared dead. During a strange episode, a vision of an undead Samantha with a piece of metal lodged in her skull takes Justin to the local church and commands him to burn it. The next day, police find Justin's dog tags in the ashes.

Samantha meets Jeremy, who is showing signs of radiation exposure from the meteorite. Justin is forging a bunny-skull mask out of scrap metal to help "his princess." Samantha wakes up next to a highway, where she encounters Randy and Corey. Samantha tells Corey she wants to get out of town but the two argue bitterly. Samantha walks away, moments before another car appears, forcing Randy to swerve his car, killing her in the crash.

Anguished about her best friend's death, Corey goes through Samantha's effects, including a book about time travel and a story Samantha wrote as a child about a unicorn who meets a boy named Justin. After a strange boy commands Corey to come with him to save Samantha, she follows him to a cave into a portal that takes her back in time.

Everything moves backwards to when Samantha is walking down the road. Corey and Randy drive up to Samantha again and Corey is nicer to her. This time, Corey is struck in a car crash. Samantha is devastated by Corey's death. After another sleepwalking incident, she sees a dress in a shop window which she recognizes from her sleepwalking visions. Jeremy exits the shop and tells her his family owns it. Randy arrives on his bike and asks if there is anything he can do to help Samantha. Samantha dismisses him and leaves before Jeremy headbutts Randy, knocking him out.

Samantha wakes up from sleepwalking and finds she is on a hilltop with Iraq Jack. He tells her his name is Justin Sparrow and the book about time travel was written by his grandmother. He made his bunny skull mask from a drawing by Samantha's deceased brother. Wandering into a nearby mine, Samantha finds the bodies of two dead boys, Randy's little brother and the missing local boy who appeared to Corey, Billy Moorcroft.

The townspeople assume that Justin is responsible for the deaths and police take him into custody. That night, Jeremy gives the dress to Samantha as a gift and he asks her to watch the July 4th fireworks show with him. On a hilltop, they see glowing tesseracts falling from the sky. He becomes manic and violent with Samantha, pushing her so hard that she falls and lies motionless; she fell onto the bunny-skull mask and a piece of it went through her head.

Samantha visits Justin in jail. Randy tries to find her as fiery tesseracts fall from the sky. Justin puts on his mask, and goes back in time to the moment he was sitting on the windmill that was destroyed by the meteorite at the beginning of the film. Justin believes that his death will prevent the series of events that will lead to the end of the world. He stays on the windmill and is killed by the meteorite.

It is now the morning after the meteorite landing again. Samantha and Corey visit the site and find the locals are saddened as they take away Justin's body. Not wanting to profit from someone's death, the owner of the land decides not to sell the meteorite. Samantha, never having experienced the events after the meteorite crash, decides to go back home while Corey stays in the small town with Randy.

Cast
 Daveigh Chase as Samantha Darko
 Briana Evigan as Corey Corn
 Ed Westwick as Randy Holt
 James Lafferty as Justin Sparrow
 Jackson Rathbone as Jeremy Frame
 Elizabeth Berkley as Trudy Kavanagh
 Matthew Davis as Pastor John Wayne
 John Hawkes as Phil
 Barbara Tarbuck as Agatha
 Zulay Henao as Baelyn

Production
Donnie Darkos writer and director, Richard Kelly, has stated that he had no involvement with S. Darko. He stated "To set the record straight, here's a few facts I'd like to share with you all—I haven't read this script. I have absolutely no involvement with this production, nor will I ever be involved." Chris Fisher, director of S. Darko, noted that he was an admirer of Kelly's film, and that he hoped "to create a similar world of blurred fantasy and reality."

The film was an independent production of Silver Nitrate Productions, and not by Newmarket Films (which produced the original film)—Newmarket had gone dormant by this time. 20th Century Fox Home Entertainment, who had the distribution rights to the first Darko, won the right to release S. Darko domestically on home video.

Filming for S. Darko began on May 18, 2008. The crew used the high resolution digital Red One cameras. Musician Ed Harcourt signed to provide the score for the film after he "read the script and loved it". For inspiration he listened to electronic music like Clint Mansell's score for Requiem for a Dream, and he hoped his score would be both "surreal and psychedelic just like the movie". S. Darko was filmed in Coalville, Utah and Magna, Utah.

Marketing
To promote the film, a viral marketing campaign was launched consisting of three YouTube videos.

The first video is footage from a surveillance camera, showing a dumpster falling from the sky and crushing a child.

The second video is from a conspiracy theorist expressing his beliefs that metallic objects which—with no apparent rational explanation—fall from the sky and lethally crush people are "Artifacts". "Artifacts", he explains, are from parallel universes that have accidentally made contact with our main universe. He believes that when the two universes meet again further down in time, both of them will be catastrophically destroyed, unless something is done to prevent this. Examples of such "Artifacts" are the jet engine that killed Donnie Darko, a manhole that decapitated a young girl, the aforementioned dumpster, and a meteor shower over Utah that resulted in the death of a local man. The meteor shower is one of the main events that happen in the movie.

The third video is from a young girl responding to the creator of the previous video. She accuses him of being a fraud and a hack who doesn't understand what he's talking about, because he stole his theories from Roberta Sparrow's book, The Philosophy of Time Travel, which was featured in the original movie. She then shows him another link between several of these disastrous events: the falling dumpster left a hole in the ground with a shape apparently similar to a drawing of Frank's mask retrieved from Donnie Darko's psych file; and the same shape also appears in a hunk of twisted, wrought-iron metal pulled from the wreckage of the windmill that was destroyed by the meteor shower in Conejo Springs.

Critical reception
The film was largely panned by critics, often citing its muddled storyline, one-sided characters, and superficial dialogue. The A.V. Club gave the film an F, noting that the sequel took "a few simple, surface elements from Donnie Darko and fail[ed] spectacularly in trying to create a franchise".

The Washington Post gave a somewhat better review, calling it average but stating that "The Darko faithful are better off skipping the movie entirely and devoting their attention to the making-of featurette and the commentary track" and that they "have little faith that the moviegoers who once fell in love with Kelly's unique take on teen alienation will see S. Darko as anything more than a very minor pop cultural footnote."

In an interview with PopMatters magazine journalist J.C. Maçek III, Donnie Darko director Richard Kelly said regarding S. Darko, "I hate it when people ask me about that sequel because...I had nothing to do with it. And I hate it when people try and blame me or hold me responsible for it because I had no [involvement]. I don’t control the underlying rights to [the Donnie Darko franchise]. I had to relinquish them when I was 24 years old. I hate when people ask me about that because I’ve never seen it and I never will, so… don’t ask me about the sequel...Those people are making lots of money. They’re certainly making lots of money."

Rotten Tomatoes gave the film a rating of 13% based on reviews from 8 critics.

Home media
The film was released on DVD and Blu-ray Disc on May 12, 2009, in the United States, and on July 6, 2009, in Europe.

References

External links
 
 
 
 

2009 films
2009 direct-to-video films
2009 psychological thriller films
2009 thriller drama films
2000s coming-of-age drama films
2000s drama road movies
2000s English-language films
2000s psychological drama films
2000s science fiction drama films
2000s science fiction thriller films
2000s teen drama films
20th Century Fox direct-to-video films
American coming-of-age drama films
American direct-to-video films
American drama road movies
American psychological drama films
American psychological thriller films
American science fiction drama films
American science fiction thriller films
American sequel films
American teen drama films
American thriller drama films
Direct-to-video sequel films
Films about time travel
Films directed by Chris Fisher
Films set in 1995
Films set in Utah
Films shot in Salt Lake City
Independence Day (United States) films
Teen thriller films
2000s American films